Malva olbia (syn. Lavatera olbia), the garden tree mallow, is a species of flowering plant in the family Malvaceae. It is native to the western Mediterranean, and has been introduced to California. A vigorous perennial shrub reaching , the Royal Horticultural Society considers it to be a good plant to attract pollinators.

Cultivars

It has a number of commercially available cultivars, which may be hybrids with Malva thuringiaca, dubbed Malva × clementii. The cultivars 'Rosea' and 'RedRum' have gained the Royal Horticultural Society's Award of Garden Merit. Other cultivars include 'Barnsley' (with white aging to shell pink flowers), 'Lilac Lady', 'Eye Catcher', 'Pink Frills', 'Wembdon Variegated', and 'Saxtead'.

References

olbia
Flora of Southwestern Europe
Flora of Italy
Flora of Sicily
Flora of Morocco
Flora of Algeria
Flora of Tunisia
Flora of Libya
Plants described in 1862